The Tuckerton School District is a community public school district that serves students in public school for pre-kindergarten through sixth grade from the borough of Tuckerton, in Ocean County, New Jersey, United States.

As of the 2020–21 school year, the district, comprised of one school, had an enrollment of 311 students and 32.0 classroom teachers (on an FTE basis), for a student–teacher ratio of 9.7:1.

The district is classified by the New Jersey Department of Education as being in District Factor Group "CD", the sixth-highest of eight groupings. District Factor Groups organize districts statewide to allow comparison by common socioeconomic characteristics of the local districts. From lowest socioeconomic status to highest, the categories are A, B, CD, DE, FG, GH, I and J.

Public school students in seventh through twelfth grades attend the schools of the Pinelands Regional School District, which also serves students from Bass River Township, Eagleswood Township and Little Egg Harbor Township. Schools in the district (with 2020–21 enrollment data from the National Center for Education Statistics) are 
Pinelands Regional Junior High School with 526 students in grades 7-8 and 
Pinelands Regional High School with 1,036 students in grades 9-12. The district's board of education includes nine members directly elected by the residents of the constituent municipalities to three-year terms on a staggered basis, with three seats up for election each year. Tuckerton is allocated one of the nine seats.

School
Tuckerton Elementary School had an enrollment of 278 students as of the 2020–21 school year (based on enrollment data from the National Center for Education Statistics).
Siobhan Grayson, Principal

Administration
Core members of the district's administration are:
Siobhan Grayson, Superintendent of Schools
Marian Smith, Business Administrator
Mary Seidenfaden, Board Secretary

Board of education
The district's board of education is comprised of nine members who set policy and oversee the fiscal and educational operation of the district through its administration. As a Type II school district, the board's trustees are elected directly by voters to serve three-year terms of office on a staggered basis, with three seats up for election each year held (since 2012) as part of the November general election. The board appoints a superintendent to oversee the district's day-to-day operations and a business administrator to supervise the business functions of the district.

References

External links
Tuckerton Elementary School
 
School Data for the Tuckerton Elementary School, National Center for Education Statistics
Pinelands Regional School District

Tuckerton, New Jersey
New Jersey District Factor Group CD
School districts in Ocean County, New Jersey
Public elementary schools in New Jersey